Welcome Wade Wilson Sr. (born 1928) is chairman of the Welcome Group—a privately held real estate development firm with 5 million square feet of industrial and manufacturing facilities in over 100 locations in the state of Texas. The company headquarters is located in Houston, Texas (USA).  He previously served on the Board of Regents of the University of Houston System, and is a 1949 graduate of the University of Houston.

Early life
Wilson graduated high school in 1944.  He attended Texas Southmost College, and graduated with an Associate of Arts degree in 1946.  Later that year, he enrolled at the University of Houston.  In 1949, he graduated with a Bachelor of Business Administration degree.  While at the University of Houston as a student, Wilson worked for The Cougar as an advertising seller under Johnny Goyen, and later as business manager.  He resided on-campus at the makeshift residential area of Army surplus trailers of the university mainly for veterans known as "Veteran's Village".  Following his graduation, he went to work for the university as the assistant director for the now defunct College of Nursing where he raised money for scholarships and recruited nursing students.

Awards and achievements 
Wilson graduated from the University of Houston in 1949 with a Bachelor of Business Administration degree. He received the University of Houston's Distinguished Alumnus Award in 1970, as well as the University of Houston's College of Business Administration Distinguished Alumnus Award in 1996. On September 30, 2010 the University of Houston named Wilson as Chairman of school's Tier One campaign. He also served as chair of the UH System Board of Regents for 3 years.

Wilson graduated with an Associate of Arts degree from Texas Southmost College in 1946, and received its Distinguished Alumnus Award in 2005. In 2018, he also received the Distinguished Alumnus Award from the UT Rio Grand Valley. Wilson received the Arthur S. Flemming Award as one of Ten Outstanding Young Men in Federal Service in 1958.  The Arthur S. Flemming Award was established in 1948 to honor outstanding federal employees. Recognized by the President of the United States, agency heads, and the private sector, the winners are selected from all areas of the federal service. The Texas Business Hall of Fame named Welcome Wilson Sr. as a Legend and Honoree in 2011. Most recently in May 2011 Wilson was named "Entrepreneur of the Year" by the Houston Technology Center.

U.S. federal government service 
Welcome W. Wilson served in the Eisenhower and Kennedy administrations as a five-state Director of Civil and Defense Mobilization, a division of the Executive Office of the President. He also had responsibility for five states of what is now known as FEMA.  In 1966 he was appointed Special Ambassador to Nicaragua by President Lyndon B. Johnson. He was a witness to the Atom bomb tests in Nevada in 1954 and the Hydrogen bomb test at Bikini Atoll in the Pacific Ocean in 1956.

References

External links

UH System Board member profile
Welcome Group
 Wilson, Welcome and Joseph Pratt. Welcome Wilson Oral History, Houston Oral History Project, September 17, 2007.

American businesspeople
People from Houston
1928 births
University of Houston System regents
University of Houston alumni
Living people